Micah Blunt is a retired American professional basketball player.

Background
The 6-9, 210-pound native of New Orleans was a product of Tulane University.

Basketball career
Blunt was the Los Angeles Lakers eighth round pick in the 1982 National Basketball Association (NBA) draft. He never made it to the Lakers official roster with only first pick James Worthy working his way up to earn a spot with the LA Lakers. He also,  had stints with the L.A.Clippers and Cleveland Cavaliers. 

Micah J. Blunt, father, mentor, coach, and non-profit founder of I.N.S.P.I.R.E. RR, Inc., is a native of New Orleans, Louisiana. He graduated from East Jefferson High School and was the first player selected in Louisiana to be named to the distinguished McDonalds Top- Twenty High School All-American Basketball Team. He attended Tulane University on a full athletic scholarship while Captain of the men’s basketball team and earned his Bachelor of Science degree in Education. Upon graduating from Tulane, he was drafted by the NBA World Champion Los Angeles Lakers in 1982.

After a brief stint in the NBA and CBA, he continued a ten-year professional basketball career in Europe where he won 5 championships in one season (European Guinness Book of World Records) while playing in the United Kingdom (England, Italy and France and reigning MVP of the English Professional Basketball League. Upon his return to the United States, Micah embarked onto an NCAA-Div. I collegiate coaching career having coached Men and Women’s Basketball at three universities; Fairleigh- Dickinson University and CSUS- Sacramento State (Men) and George Mason University (Women) Basketball Coach. During his coaching tenure, his men’s team (FDU) played in the postseason NIT, and the GMU women’s team finished as conference champion runner-up.

Over the past 20 years, Micah has had a career in Human Resources Management and Leadership. His experience as a director, manager, and generalist in different industries such as Logistics and Distribution Centers, Poultry Industry, Corporate HR, Food Service Industry, Mfg., HealthCare, and the Gaming Industry. His unique sets of skills and knowledge are a perfect fit for serving people in the human capital industry.

Micah’s longtime community involvement goes back to his school days as a member of the Fellowship of Christian Athletes, Big Brothers, and Special Olympics Volunteer. His community involvement led to the creation of I.N.S.P.I.R.E. RR, Inc., a Rewards and Recognition Program for reading.

Micah is the father of Marie and Myles Blunt.

External links
 basketball.realgm.com

Living people
American expatriate basketball people in France
American expatriate basketball people in the Philippines
British Basketball League players
Evansville Thunder players
Los Angeles Lakers draft picks
McDonald's High School All-Americans
Parade High School All-Americans (boys' basketball)
Philippine Basketball Association imports
Basketball players from New Orleans
Tulane Green Wave men's basketball players
American men's basketball players
East Jefferson High School alumni
Year of birth missing (living people)
Centers (basketball)
American expatriate basketball people in the United Kingdom
American expatriate sportspeople in England